32145 Katberman, provisional designation , is a stony asteroid from the inner regions of the asteroid belt, approximately 4 kilometers in diameter. The asteroid was discovered on 7 June 2000, by the LINEAR team at Lincoln Laboratory's Experimental Test Site in Socorro, New Mexico, United States. It was named for Katharine Berman, a 2016 Intel STS awardee.

Orbit and classification 

Katberman orbits the Sun in the inner main-belt at a distance of 2.0–2.8 AU once every 3 years and 9 months (1,370 days). Its orbit has an eccentricity of 0.18 and an inclination of 9° with respect to the ecliptic.

The asteroid's observation arc begins 4 years prior to its official discovery observation, with a precovery taken by the Steward Observatory's Spacewatch survey at Kitt Peak in June 1996.

Physical characteristics

Diameter and albedo 

According to the survey carried out by the NEOWISE mission of NASA's space-based Wide-field Infrared Survey Explorer, Katberman measures 4.4 kilometers in diameter and its surface has an albedo of 0.16, while the Collaborative Asteroid Lightcurve Link assumes a standard albedo for a stony asteroid of 0.20 and calculates a diameter of 2.9 kilometers with an absolute magnitude of 15.04.

Rotation period 

In October 2012, and January 2014, three rotational lightcurves of Katberman were obtained from photometric observations at the Palomar Transient Factory in California.

Naming 

This minor planet was named after Katharine Barr Berman (born 1998) awardee in the Intel Science Talent Search of 2016. She was a finalist for her cellular and molecular biology project. At the time, she attended the U.S. Hastings High School in New York. The official naming citation was published by the Minor Planet Center on 21 May 2016.

References

External links 
 Asteroid Lightcurve Database (LCDB), query form (info )
 Dictionary of Minor Planet Names, Google books
 Asteroids and comets rotation curves, CdR – Observatoire de Genève, Raoul Behrend
 Discovery Circumstances: Numbered Minor Planets (30001)-(35000) – Minor Planet Center
 
 

032145
032145
Named minor planets
20000607